Robert Haworth (26 June 1897 – 1962) was an English footballer best known for playing for Bolton Wanderers, for whom he made over 300 appearances in The Football League. He played for the team in the 1923, 1926 and 1929 FA Cup Finals, winning on each occasion.

References

1897 births
1962 deaths
People from Atherton, Greater Manchester
English footballers
Atherton Collieries A.F.C. players
Bolton Wanderers F.C. players
Accrington Stanley F.C. (1891) players
English Football League players
Association football fullbacks
FA Cup Final players